Charles Hemming Jacoby Jr. (born June 19, 1954) is a retired United States Army general who served as the fifth Commander of United States Northern Command (USNORTHCOM) and the 22nd Commander of North American Aerospace Defense Command (NORAD). Jacoby was the first army officer to assume command of Northern Command. He previously served as the Director for Strategic Plans and Policy, The Joint Staff. He assumed command of USNORTHCOM and NORAD on August 3, 2011, and was succeeded by Admiral William E. Gortney on December 5, 2014. Jacoby is notable as the first non-command pilot to serve as commander of either NORAD/USNORTHCOM, as both commands have traditionally been dominated by Air Force officers and NORAD carries a heavy air interdiction mission.

Education
A 1978 graduate of the United States Military Academy, Jacoby attended the Infantry Officer Basic and Advanced courses, the Army Command and General Staff College, the School of Advanced Military Studies, and the National War College.

Jacoby has a master's degree in History from the University of Michigan.

Awards and decorations
Individual awards

Unit awards

International military award

Foreign awards

Badges

Other accoutrements

Gallery

References

External links
 
Defense News Interview with General Charles Jacoby

Deep State Radio Network, 2/2019, ARE WE READY FOR THE FUTURE OF WAR?: A CONVERSATION WITH GENERAL (RET.) CHARLES JACOBY

1954 births
Living people
Military personnel from Detroit
United States Military Academy alumni
University of Michigan alumni
United States Army generals
Recipients of the Distinguished Service Medal (US Army)
Recipients of the Legion of Merit
Recipients of the Defense Superior Service Medal
Recipients of the Defense Distinguished Service Medal